South Carolina Highway 202 (SC 202) is a  state highway in the U.S. state of South Carolina. The highway connects Little Mountain and the Pomaria area. Though signed as an east-west highway, it runs in a south-to-north fashion.

Route description
SC 202 begins at an intersection with U.S. Route 76 (US 76; Main Street) in Little Mountain, within Newberry, where the roadway continues as a local road in downtown Little Mountain. It travels to the north-northwest and leaves the city limits. The highway immediately curves to the north-northeast and has an interchange with Interstate 26 (I-26). It curves to the north and crosses over Rocky Creek. After one final north-northwest segment, the highway curves to the northeast and meets its western terminus, an intersection with US 176, at a point southeast of Pomaria.

Major intersections

See also

References

External links

SC 202 at Virginia Highways' South Carolina Highways Annex

202
Transportation in Newberry County, South Carolina